Friden is a hamlet in the civil parish of Hartington Nether Quarter, Derbyshire, England.

The name "Friden" is derived from the goddess Frig, the wife of Woden.  It is on the route of the former Cromford and High Peak Railway, which now forms the High Peak Trail. Friden Grange is a Grade II listed building. It is notable for the manufacture of refractory products at Friden brickworks.

See also
 Listed buildings in Hartington Nether Quarter
 List of places in Derbyshire

References

External links

Hamlets in Derbyshire
Towns and villages of the Peak District
Derbyshire Dales